The Geography of Kenya is diverse, varying amongst its 47 counties. Kenya has a coastline on the Indian Ocean, which contains swamps of East African mangroves. Inland are broad plains and numerous hills. Kenya borders South Sudan to the northwest, Uganda to the west, Somalia to the east, Tanzania to the south, and Ethiopia to the north.

Central and Western Kenya is characterised by the Kenyan Rift Valley and central Province home to the highest mountain, Mount Kenya and Mount Elgon on the border between Kenya and Uganda. The Kakamega Forest in western Kenya is a relic of an East African rainforest. Much bigger is Mau Forest, the largest forest complex in East Africa.

Geography

Location 
 Eastern Africa on the Indian Ocean coast between Somalia and Tanzania
 Geographic coordinates:

Area 
 Total: 
 Land: 
 Water:

Land boundaries 
 Total: 
 Border countries: Ethiopia , Somalia , South Sudan , Tanzania , Uganda

Coastline
 536 km (333 mi) along the Indian Ocean.

Maritime claims
 Territorial sea: 
 Exclusive economic zone:  and  
 Continental shelf: 200 m depth or to the depth of exploitation

Geology

Much of the western two-thirds of the country consists of the Pliocene–Pleistocene volcanics deposited on Precambrian basement rocks. The southeast corner of the country is underlain by sediments of the Karoo System of Permian to Late Triassic age and a strip of Jurassic age sediments along the coast in the Mombasa area. The Anza trough is a NW–SE trending Jurassic rift extending from the Indian Ocean coast to the Sudan northwest of Lake Turkana. The Anza Rift resulted from the break–up of Gondwana.

Climate

The climate of Kenya varies by location, from mostly cool every day, to always warm/hot. The climate along the coast is tropical. This means rainfall and temperatures are higher throughout the year. At the coastal cities, Mombasa, Lamu and Malindi, the air changes from cool to hot, almost every day. (See chart below).

The further inside Kenya, the more arid the climate becomes. An arid climate is nearly devoid of rainfall, and temperature swings widely according to the general time of the day/night. For many areas of Kenya, the daytime temperature rises about 12 °C (corresponding to a rise of about 22 °F), almost every day.

Elevation is the major factor in temperature levels, with the higher areas, on average, as 11 °C (20 °F) cooler, day or night. At night, heavy clothes or blankets are needed, in the highlands, when the temperature drops to about  every night.

At lower altitudes, the increased temperature is like day and night, literally: like starting the morning at the highland daytime high, and then adding the heat of the day, again. Hence, the overnight low temperatures near sea level are nearly the same as the high temperatures of the elevated Kenyan highlands. However, locations along the Indian Ocean have more moderate temperatures, as a few degrees cooler in the daytime, such as at Mombasa (see chart below).

Although Kenya is centred at the equator, it shares the seasons of the Southern Hemisphere: with the warmest summer months in December–March and the coolest winter months in June–August, again with differences in temperature varying by location within the country.

On the high mountains, such as Mount Kenya, Mount Elgon and Kilimanjaro, the weather can become bitterly cold for most of the year. Some snowfall occurs on the highest mountains.

Climate change

Terrain

Kenya's terrain is composed of low plains that rise into central highlands that are, in turn, bisected by the Great Rift Valley. There is also a fertile plateau in the west of the country.

Elevation extremes
The lowest point on Kenya is at sea level on the Indian Ocean. The highest point on Kenya is 5,197 meters above sea level at Mount Kenya.

Rivers
The notable rivers in Kenya are the Athi-Galana-Sabaki River, which at a total length of about 390 kilometers while draining an area of about 70,000 square kilometers, is the second longest river in the country, the Tana River, the longest river in the country at a total length of just over 1000 kilometers, covering a catchment area of over 100,000 square kilometers, and the Nzoia River, which is a  river, rising from Mount Elgon, which flows so

Natural resources
Natural resources that are found in Kenya include: limestone, soda ash, salt, gemstones, fluorite, zinc, diatomite, oil, gas, gold, gypsum, wildlife and hydropower.

Land use
9.8% of the land is arable; permanent crops occupy 0.9% of the land, permanent pasture occupies 37.4% of the land; forest occupies 6.1% of the land. Other uses make up the rest of Kenya's land. This is as of 2011.

1,032 km2 of Kenyan land was irrigated in 2003.

Total renewable water resources
30.7 km3 (2011)

Freshwater withdrawal
 Total: 2.74 km3/yr (17%/4%/79%)
 Per capita: 72.96 m3/yr (2003)

Gallery

Natural hazards
Natural hazards include recurring drought and flooding during the rainy seasons.

There is limited volcanic activity in the country. Barrier Volcano (elev. 1,032 m) last erupted in 1921. Several others have been historically active (see List of volcanoes in Kenya).

Environmental issues

Current issues

Current issues that threaten the environment at the moment include water pollution from urban and industrial wastes; degradation of water quality from the increased use of pesticides and fertilisers; deforestation; water hyacinth infestation in Lake Victoria; soil erosion; desertification; and poaching.

International agreements
 Party to: Biodiversity, Climate Change, Climate Change-Kyoto Protocol, Desertification, Endangered Species, Hazardous Wastes, Law of the Sea, Marine Dumping, Marine Life Conservation, Ozone Layer Protection, Ship Pollution (MARPOL 73/78), Wetlands, Whaling.

Extreme points 

This is a list of the extreme points of Kenya, the points that are further north, south, east or west than any other location.

 Northernmost point – Kalukwakerith Mountain, Turkana County
 Easternmost point – the tripoint with Ethiopia and Somalia, Mandera County
 Southernmost point – the point where the border with Tanzania enters the Indian Ocean, Kwale County
 Westernmost point – unnamed land west of Port Victoria, Busia County
 Note: Kalukwakerith Mountain is in the disputed Ilemi Triangle region. If this area is excluded then Kenya does not have a northernmost point, the northern border being a straight line.

See also

 Environmental issues in Kenya
 List of national parks of Kenya
 Ilemi Triangle
 Mandera triangle

References